was a Japanese social philosopher and critic.

Biography
He studied philosophy at Hosei University (Tokyo), graduating in 1940. In 1944 he was sent to Halmahera; he returned to Japan in 1946. Two years later he started teaching philosophy at his old university, where he would stay until 1970. Thereafter he supported himself by his writing.

Fukuda — the name he used as a teacher as well as a writer — was a prolific author: a hyōronka (critic or pundit) and popularizer of philosophy. He died on 11 December 2002.

Sources 

 Gendai Nihon shippitsusha daijiten / Contemporary writers in Japan. 5 vols. Tokyo: Nichigai Associates, 1979.
 Hyōronka jinmei-jiten / Japanese critics and commentators: A biographical dictionary. Tokyo: Nichigai Associates, 1990. 
 20-seiki Nihon jinmei-jiten / Major 20th-century people in Japan: A biographical dictionary. 2 vols. Tokyo: Nichigai Associates, 2004. 

1917 births
2002 deaths
20th-century Japanese philosophers
Japanese critics
Social philosophers
Hosei University alumni